The South Omaha Veterans Memorial Bridge (originally the South Omaha Bridge but renamed the Veterans Memorial Bridge in 1995) was a continuous warren through truss bridge over the Missouri River connecting Omaha, Nebraska with Council Bluffs, Iowa via U.S. Highway 275.

Omaha floated a $2 million bond issue for the bridge in 1931.  However, when the bonds did not sell, the Omaha Bridge Commission was formed to secure financing from the Public Works Administration.  The initial design by the Kansas City architects Ash, Howard, Needles and Tammen called for the bridge to have seven spans.  However, when the War Department announced plans to reroute the river channel, the design was changed to two , continuously supported, Warren through spans and a series of Warren deck truss approach spans.

It was built by the Kansas City Bridge Company opening on January 18, 1936. The piers were initially on dry land, since the river had not been rerouted. Tolls on the bridge were discontinued on September 25, 1947.

The bridge provided a much-needed direct route across the Missouri River to the Omaha Stockyards for livestock delivery trucks. Before the South Omaha Bridge was built trucks had to cross the Douglas Street Bridge and drive through downtown Omaha to reach the packinghouse district.
Although listed on the National Register of Historic Places in 1992, the bridge was torn down so a new four-lane girder bridge could be constructed with a target opening date in 2010. In November 2006 Nebraska placed a 5-ton vehicle limit on the bridge. On June 11, 2008, an additional height restriction requiring vehicles to be under  was imposed. On September 8, 2009, at 9 am CDT, the bridge closed so that the new bridge's construction could continue. The original bridge was completely demolished by March 2010 and removed from the NRHP in 2011.

The new bridge opened May 28, 2010.

See also
 
 
 
 List of crossings of the Missouri River
 List of historic bridges in Nebraska

References

External links

Historic Postcard of South Omaha Bridge, with tollbooth
Omaha River Front article
Historic Bridges of Douglas County
JD Morrison history of bridge
Nebraska Transportation On New Bridge
Eomahaforums discussion

Bridges over the Missouri River
Road bridges in Iowa
Road bridges in Nebraska
Buildings and structures in Council Bluffs, Iowa
Historic bridges in Omaha, Nebraska
History of South Omaha, Nebraska
Bridges completed in 1935
Bridges completed in 2010
Bridges in Pottawattamie County, Iowa
Bridges of the United States Numbered Highway System
U.S. Route 275
Former toll bridges in Iowa
Former toll bridges in Nebraska
Former National Register of Historic Places in Iowa
Former National Register of Historic Places in Nebraska
Landmarks in South Omaha, Nebraska
Monuments and memorials in Iowa
Monuments and memorials in Nebraska
Warren truss bridges in the United States
1935 establishments in Iowa
1935 establishments in Nebraska
2010 disestablishments in Iowa
2010 disestablishments in Nebraska
Interstate vehicle bridges in the United States